"Waiting..." is the first single from City and Colour's second album, Bring Me Your Love. The song peaked at No. 32 on the Canadian Hot 100.

References

External links

2008 singles
City and Colour songs
2008 songs
Songs written by Dallas Green (musician)
Dine Alone Records singles